Kilpennathur is a state assembly constituency in Tamil Nadu, India, that was formed after constituency delimitations in 2007. Its State Assembly Constituency number is 64. It comprises a portion of Tiruvannamalai taluk and is included in the similarly named parliamentary constituency for national elections. It is one of the 234 State Legislative Assembly Constituencies in Tamil Nadu, in India.

Members of the Legislative Assembly

Election results

2021

2016

2011

References 

Assembly constituencies of Tamil Nadu
Tiruvannamalai district